Ponta Cabinet may refer to the following governments of Romania, led by Victor Ponta:

First Ponta cabinet (May – December 2012)
Second Ponta cabinet (December 2012 – March 2014)
Third Ponta Cabinet (March – December 2014)
Fourth Ponta Cabinet (December 2014 – November 2015)

See also
Victor Ponta (born 1972)
Ponta (disambiguation)